Richard Henryk Twardzik (April 30, 1931 – October 21, 1955) was an American jazz pianist who worked in Boston for most of his career.

Career
Twardzik trained in classical piano as a child and made his professional debut at the age of fourteen. He was taught by Margaret Chaloff, the mother of baritone saxophone player Serge Chaloff. Twardzik recorded with Serge Chaloff and with Charlie Mariano. He worked with Charlie Parker on several occasions toward the end of Parker's life. Twardzik also played professionally with Chet Baker and Lionel Hampton. He recorded with Baker and Chaloff in 1954 and 1955.

In his teenage years, Twardzik became addicted to heroin. He died from a heroin overdose, while on tour with Chet Baker in Europe.

Discography

As leader
 Trio with Russ Freeman (Pacific Jazz, 1956)

As sideman
 Chet Baker, Chet Baker in Europe (Pacific Jazz, 1955)
 Serge Chaloff, The Fabel of Mabel (1201 Music, 1999)
 Charlie Parker, The Happy Bird (Charlie Parker, 1961)
 Charlie Parker, Boston, 1952 (Uptown UPCD 27.42, 1996)

References

Further reading
Jack Chambers, Bouncing with Bartok, Toronto: Mercury Press, 2008,

External links
"The Tragedy of Richard Twardzik" by Ted Gioia (review of Chambers book)

1931 births
1955 deaths
Jazz musicians from Massachusetts
People from Danvers, Massachusetts
20th-century American male musicians
20th-century American pianists
American jazz pianists
American male pianists
Deaths by heroin overdose
Drug-related deaths in France
American male jazz musicians